Édgar Armando Benítez Delgado (born 26 March 1998) is a Mexican footballer who plays as a defender.

References

External links
 

1998 births
Living people
Sportspeople from Tampico, Tamaulipas
Footballers from Tamaulipas
Association football defenders
Mexican footballers
Correcaminos UAT footballers
Irapuato F.C. footballers
Atlético Reynosa footballers
Liga MX players
Ascenso MX players
Liga Premier de México players
Tercera División de México players